The Idu Mishmi language is a small language spoken by the Mishmi people in Dibang Valley district, Lower Dibang Valley district, Lohit district, East Siang district, Upper Siang district of the Indian state of Arunachal Pradesh and in Zayü County of the Tibet Autonomous Region, China.  There were 8569 speakers in India in 1981 and 7000 speakers in China in 1994. It is considered an endangered language.

Locations
In China, Idu Mishmi is spoken in Xiba village 西巴村, which has just over 40 residents and is located at the foot of Xikong Mountain 习孔山. Xiba village is located 10 kilometers from the nearest administrative center, namely Migu village 米古村 (Jiang 2005:4). The Idu live in the Danba River 丹巴江 and E River 额河 watersheds in Zayü County, Tibet. They are officially classified by the Chinese government as ethnic Lhoba people.

In India, the Idu are found in Arunachal Pradesh.

Script
The Idu Mishmi people did not usually have a script of their own. When needed Idu Mishmis tended to use the Tibetan script. Currently the Idu Mishmi have developed a script known as "Idu Azobra".

Alternative names
The Idu Mishmi language is often referred to as:
 Sulikata by the indigenous Assamese people of the Assam Plains.
 Idu in general.
 Yidu may be used in China.
 Midu, Mindri and Mithu (also called Bebejias by the indigenous Assamese ethnicities) are subclassifications within the Idu tribe based on the pitch and pronunciation of certain words. However, Idu people prefer the ethnonym "Kera-Ah" (children of Kera)

Dialects

Registers
Idu has various registers that are used in different situations. These include:

shamanic register
hunting register
cursing register
mediation register
mourning register
babytalk register
humorous register

References

Further reading
Blench, Roger. 2017. A dictionary of Idu, a language of Arunachal Pradesh. Roing, Arunachal Pradesh: Mishmi Publishing House.
Blench, Roger. 2016. Attempts to write the Idu language and a proposal for a modern orthography.
Blench, Roger. 2016. Hunting among the Idu, a people of Arunachal Pradesh.
Blench, Roger, Mite Linggi, Hindu Meme, and Apomo Linggi. 2016. Reading and writing Idu: a book of letters. Roing, Arunachal Pradesh: Idu Language Development Committee.
 Preliminary notes on the phonology of Ida Mishmi
 Discovery - Endangered Languages
 Idu Mishmi alphabet

Definitely endangered languages
Digaro languages
Mishmi languages
Languages of China
Languages of Tibet
Languages of Arunachal Pradesh